Mittelberg is a municipality in the district of Bregenz in the Kleinwalsertal,in the Austrian state of Vorarlberg. It is accessible by road only from Germany.

Geography
The town of Mittelberg lies in the Kleinwalsertal, a valley that is accessible by road only from Germany.
The largest stream in the municipality is the Breitach which originates in Baad and flows through all three villages of Mittelberg, Hirschegg and Riezlern. It receives water of the side streams such as Derrabach, Turabach, Bärgundbach, Gemstelbach and Wildenbach.

The main mountains of Mittelberg include Elfer (2387 m) Bärenkopf (Allgäu Alps) (2083 m), Walmendingerhorn  (1990 m), Grosser Widderstein (2536 m) and Zwölfer (2224 m).

History
Mittelberg was settled around 1300 by five Walser families from Tannberg coming across over the Hochalppass. The first houses were probably in Bödmen, a district of Mittelberg. The settlers inherited the land from the Swabian Counts of Rettenberg. The valley initially belonged to the Walser court of Tannberg but in 1563 the valley was awarded its own court in Mittelberg, which existed until 1807.

Population
Although it is not an exclave in a strict sense (it is contiguous with the rest of Austria), its geographic position creates a special situation for inhabitants and visitors. For instance, it has both Austrian and German postal codes. Since 1891 Kleinwalsertal has been in the German customs union, and has an open border with that country. 

Before the introduction of the euro the Deutsche Mark was used there. Since Austria joined the European Union (1995), the Schengen Agreement was ratified (1997), and the Euro was introduced (2002), this special status no longer applies.
However, due to its location several taxation differences apply, such as a lower VAT rate.

Education
Kindergartens:
 Kindergarten 
 Kindergarten 
 Kindergarten Riezlern

In popular culture 
Mittelberg was the setting of "The Final Reich," one of the levels of Call of Duty: World War II: Nazi Zombies.

See also
 Horizon Field, 2010 sculpture installation by Antony Gormley.

References

Cities and towns in Bregenz District